The 1984 Women's World Amateur Snooker Championship was a 1984 edition of the World Women's Snooker Championship, first held in 1976, and was played at the Breaks Snooker Sporting Club, Coventry, from 6 to 7 October. The tournament was won by Stacey Hillyard, aged 15, who defeated Natalie Stelmach 4–1 in the final.

Overview 
Following the 1983 Women's World Snooker Championship, the promotional company Ladies Snooker International, which was controlled by some of the same personnel involved in the World Ladies Billiards and Snooker Association (WLBSA), announced the initiation of a professional division for women's snooker, which later included the 1984 Women's Grand Prix, but not a world professional championship.

The 1984 Women's World Amateur Snooker Championship, organised by the WLBSA, had 64 entrants and was sponsored by First Leisure and Bass Mitchells and Butlers, with a prize fund of £3,000. The top sixteen seeds joined the draw at the last 32 stage. First round matches were the best-of-three frames, and the other rounds before the quarter-finals were the best-of-five frames, these being played on 6 October. Matches from the quarter-finals onwards were the best-of-seven frames, and were played on 7 October.

Hillyard took a 2–0 lead against Stelmach in the final, and after losing the third frame, went on to win 4–1 and take the title and win £1,000 in prize money.

Hillyard also compiled the highest  of the event, 48, for which she earned a further £100.

Prize fund 

There was a total prize fund of £3,000. The breakdown of prize money for the event is shown below:

Winner: £1,000
Runner-up: £500
Semi-finalists: £250
Quarter-finalists: £125
Last 16: £50
Highest break: £100

Main Draw 

The numbers in parentheses beside some of the players are their seeding ranks where known, while players in bold denote match winners.

Notes

References 

World Women's Snooker Championship
World Women's Championship
World Women's Snooker Championship
World Snooker Championship